Hitoki Iwase (岩瀬 仁紀, born November 10, 1974) is a retired Japanese professional baseball player from Nishio, Aichi, Japan. He holds the NPB record for career saves and mound appearances.

In 2005, he marked 46 saves with a 1.88 ERA, renewing the single-season save record previously set by Kazuhiro Sasaki. This was subsequently broken by Dennis Sarfate of the Fukuoka SoftBank Hawks in 2017.

He was chosen to play on the Japanese Olympic baseball team for the 2004 Summer Olympics, and won a bronze medal.  In the 2007 Japan Series, he saved a perfect game with eight innings thrown by Daisuke Yamai.

In 2008, he was selected to play on the Japanese Olympic baseball team for the 2008 Summer Olympics. In group stage against South Korean Olympic baseball team, his pitch was hit by Hyunsoo Kim, which resulted in a loss. In the semifinal round against the South Korean team, his pitch was hit by Seung-Yeop Lee, leading to a two-run homerun.  This again led to another loss. His overall performance in the 2008 Summer Olympics included three defeats and an ERA of 13.75.

References

External links

Career statistics - NPB.jp
Japanese league stats and info of Hitoki Iwase

1974 births
Living people
People from Nishio, Aichi
Baseball people from Aichi Prefecture
Nippon Professional Baseball pitchers
Chunichi Dragons players
Baseball players at the 2004 Summer Olympics
Baseball players at the 2008 Summer Olympics
Olympic baseball players of Japan
Olympic bronze medalists for Japan
Olympic medalists in baseball
Medalists at the 2004 Summer Olympics
Nippon Professional Baseball pitchers who have pitched a perfect game
21st-century Japanese people